Steppin' Razor  may refer to:

Music
 "Steppin' Razor", 1967 song written by Joe Higgs and recorded by:
 Peter Tosh, from the 1977 album Equal Rights
 Bob Marley & the Wailers, from The Complete Bob Marley & the Wailers 1967–1972
 Sinéad O'Connor, on tour for the 2005 album Throw Down Your Arms
 Sublime, on the 1994 album Robbin' the Hood
 The Kills, as the B-side to their cover of Saul Williams' "List of Demands," released as a single in 2018
 Steppin' Razor (band), a reggae band started by Pamela Fleming
 An alternative name for the British electronic music band Underworld

Fiction
 Steppin' Razor (comics), a Marvel Comics characters
 Molly Millions, a character in the 1984 cyberpunk novel Neuromancer by William  Gibson
 "Steppin' Razor", a 2014 short story by Maurice Broaddus
 Stepping Razor, a 1997 book of poetry by Aldon Lynn Nielsen

Other uses
 Steppin' Razor, a radio program with Jamaican dub poet Mutabaruka
 Stepping Razor: Red X, a 1992 documentary film about Peter Tosh's life